Lepturacanthus is a genus of cutlassfish from the Indo-Pacific region. They are benthopelagic species of waters over the continental shelf, it is a predator of a variety of small coastal fishes, squid and crustaceans.

Species
The following species comprise the genus Lepturacanthus:

 Lepturacanthus pantului, (Gupta, 1966) (Coromandel hairtail)
 Lepturacanthus roelandti  (Bleeker, 1860)
 Lepturacanthus savala, (Cuvier, 1829) (Savalani hairtail)

References

Marine fish genera
Trichiuridae